Selam may refer to:

 Selam, Champhai, a village in Mizoram, India
 Selam (Australopithecus), a hominin fossil
 An alternative spelling of "salaam", a short form of the greeting As-salamu alaykum
 Selam (film), a 2013 Turkish drama film
 Selam Musai (1857–1920), Albanian military leader
Selam Tesfaye (born 1992), Ethiopian film actress

See also
 Hagere Selam (Degua Tembien), a town in Ethiopia
 Selam, a municipality in Ethiopia
 Salaam (disambiguation)
 Salem (disambiguation)